Ryan Scott Thompson (born June 26, 1992) is an American professional baseball pitcher for the Tampa Bay Rays of Major League Baseball (MLB). He made his MLB debut in 2020. Thompson is a submarine-style pitcher.

Career

Amateur career
Thompson attended Cascade High School in Turner, Oregon and played college baseball at Chemeketa Community College and Campbell University. In 2013, he briefly played collegiate summer baseball for the Hyannis Harbor Hawks of the Cape Cod Baseball League.

Houston Astros
The Houston Astros selected Thompson in the 23rd round of the 2014 Major League Baseball draft. He made his professional debut with the Low-A Tri-City ValleyCats, posting a 2.96 ERA in 23 appearances. In 2015, Thompson pitched for the Single-A Quad Cities River Bandits and the High-A Lancaster JetHawks, registering a 3.00 ERA with 60 strikeouts in 43 total appearances. The following season, Thompson split the year between Lancaster and the Double-A Corpus Christi Hooks, recording a 3.35 ERA with 65 strikeouts in another 43 appearances. In 2017, Thompson played for Corpus Christi and the Triple-A Fresno Grizzlies, logging a 4.05 ERA with 61 strikeouts in  innings pitched across 37 games. Thompson missed the entire 2018 season due to injury.

Tampa Bay Rays
Thompson was chosen by the Tampa Bay Rays in the minor league phase of the 2018 Rule 5 Draft on December 13, 2018. Thompson spent the 2019 season with the High-A Charlotte Stone Crabs and the Double-A Montgomery Biscuits, recording a 2.70 ERA in 16 games between the two teams.

Thompson made the Rays' Opening Day roster in 2020. On July 24, 2020, he made his MLB debut. In his debut campaign, Thompson was 1-2 with one save and a 4.44 ERA. In 2021, Thompson was shut down in late June due to right shoulder inflammation, and was later placed on the 60-day injured list on August 3. On September 24, 2021, it was announced that Thompson would undergo surgery to address thoracic outlet syndrome. He finished the year with a 2.38 ERA in 36 appearances.

On June 4, 2022, Thompson, along with four other Rays teammates, opted out of wearing a Rays team logo and cap in support of LGBTQ+ Pride, during the team's annual Pride Night celebration at Tropicana Field.

See also
Rule 5 draft results

References

External links

1992 births
Living people
Baseball players from Oregon
Campbell Fighting Camels baseball players
Charlotte Stone Crabs players
Chemeketa Storm baseball players
Corpus Christi Hooks players
Fresno Grizzlies players
Hyannis Harbor Hawks players
Lancaster JetHawks players
Major League Baseball pitchers
Montgomery Biscuits players
Quad Cities River Bandits players
Tampa Bay Rays players
Tri-City ValleyCats players
Turner, Oregon